Roseburia intestinalis is a saccharolytic, butyrate-producing bacterium first isolated from human faeces. It is anaerobic, gram-positive, non-sporeforming, slightly curved rod-shaped and motile by means of multiple subterminal flagella. L1-82T (= DSM 14610T = NCIMB 13810T) is the type strain.

References

Further reading
Cullender, Tyler. "Anti-flagellin antibodies inhibit motility in Roseburia intestinalis and Clostridium ramosum." (2013).

External links
LPSN
Type strain of Roseburia intestinalis at BacDive -  the Bacterial Diversity Metadatabase

Lachnospiraceae
Bacteria described in 2002